The 2005 Jacksonville Jaguars season was the eleventh season in franchise history. The Jaguars finished 12–4 in the regular season, but did not manage to win their own division, being swept by the Indianapolis Colts who finished 14–2. The Jaguars reached the playoffs for the first time since 1999, but lost in the Wild Card Round of the playoffs to the New England Patriots.

Offseason

Draft

Personnel

Staff

Roster

Regular season 

Note: Intra-division opponents are in bold text.

Standings

Postseason

Schedule

AFC Wild Card Playoffs: at (4) New England Patriots

References 
 Pro Football Reference

Jacksonville Jaguars
Jacksonville Jaguars seasons
Jackson